The 1965 Appalachian State Mountaineers football team was an American football team that represented Appalachian State Teachers College (now known as Appalachian State University) as a member of the Carolinas Conference during the 1965 NAIA football season. In their first year under head coach Carl Messere, the Mountaineers compiled an overall record of 5–5, with a mark of 3–3 in conference play, and finished tied for fourth in the Carolinas Conference.

Schedule

References

Appalachian State
Appalachian State Mountaineers football seasons
Appalachian State Mountaineers football